Walter Clyde Murray Jr. (born December 13, 1962) is a former American football wide receiver who played two seasons with the Indianapolis Colts of the National Football League. He was drafted by the Washington Redskins in the second round of the 1986 NFL Draft. He played college football at the University of Hawaii at Manoa and attended Berkeley High School in Berkeley, California. Murray was also a member of the Edmonton Eskimos and Hamilton Tiger-Cats of the Canadian Football League.

References

External links
Just Sports Stats
College stats

Living people
1962 births
Players of American football from Berkeley, California
American football wide receivers
Canadian football wide receivers
African-American players of American football
African-American players of Canadian football
Hawaii Rainbow Warriors football players
Indianapolis Colts players
Edmonton Elks players
Hamilton Tiger-Cats players
Sportspeople from Berkeley, California
National Football League replacement players
21st-century African-American people
20th-century African-American sportspeople